Spider-Man XXX: A Porn Parody is a 2011 American adult entertainment superhero film written by Axel Braun and Bryn Pryor, and directed by Braun for Vivid Entertainment. As a parody of the Spider-Man comic book series by Marvel, the film stars Xander Corvus, Capri Anderson, Ash Hollywood, and Sarah Shevon.

Plot
J. Jonah Jameson is attempting to run the Daily Bugle, which is harassing the "menace" known as Spider-Man, while his  employees Betty Brant and Robbie Robertson have intimate relations in a back room. Across town, a power line accident results in an electric company worker being granted the power to generate and control electricity. The worker decides to become a supervillain, and so dons a costume and rechristens himself Electro. Electro hires a prostitute, and electrocutes her after they have sex. The Kingpin of Crime, Wilson Fisk, then approaches Electro, and hires him as part of an elaborate scheme.

Meanwhile, Peter Parker and his promiscuous girlfriend Mary-Jane Watson are walking through an alley when Peter's spider-sense warns him of impending danger. Peter leaves Mary-Jane alone in the alley in order to change into his Spider-Man costume, and the danger that Peter had detected manifests as a gang of thugs who threaten Mary-Jane. Peter reappears as Spider-Man in time to save Mary-Jane, and Mary-Jane rewards the hero with the classic upside-down kiss, which continues into upside-down oral sex. Spider-Man then leaves Mary-Jane, and returns changed back into his Peter Parker attire.

Peter and Mary-Jane meet up with Gwen Stacy and Flash Thompson for an off-camera double date to watch the film Black Swan. After they return to Flash's apartment, the city suffers a large scale blackout. Peter alleges that he must go check on his Aunt May, and leaves Mary-Jane at Flash's apartment. Flash suggests that Gwen and Mary-Jane join him in a threesome, and both agree, though due to the blackout much of this is only partially visible.

Spider-Man confronts Electro, and engages in a brief fight that ends when Electro accidentally electrocutes himself. Black Widow appears, and attempts to seduce Spider-Man into joining the Avengers. Peter returns home after having sex with Black Widow, and is greeted by his Aunt May, who is being visited by Otto Octavius.

Cast

 Xander Corvus as Spider-Man/Peter Parker
 Capri Anderson as Mary Jane Watson
 Ash Hollywood as Gwen Stacy
 Sarah Shevon as Betty Brant
 Brooklyn Lee as Black Widow/Natasha Romanoff
 Tyler Knight as Robbie Robertson
 Lily Labeau as Liz Allan
 Robert Black as J. Jonah Jameson
 Tara Lynn Foxx as Shocked Hooker
 Blyth Hess as Aunt May
 Dick Delaware as Electro/Max Dillon
 Seth Dickens as Flash Thompson
 Michael Vegas as Harry Osborn
 Peter O'Tool as Wilson Fisk/Kingpin
 James Bartholet as Doctor Octopus/Otto Octavius

Awards and nominations

Follow-ups 
The film was preceded by Superman vs. Spider-Man XXX: An Axel Braun Parody in 2012, and Spider-Man XXX 2: An Axel Braun Parody in 2014. Xander Corvus also reprised his role as Spider-Man in 2013's Wolverine XXX: An Axel Braun Parody, and 2015's Avengers XXX 2: An Axel Braun Parody.

See also
Bat Pussy
BatfXXX: Dark Night Parody
Batman XXX: A Porn Parody
Superman vs. Spider-Man XXX: An Axel Braun Parody
This Ain't Avatar XXX

References

External links 
 
 
 
 

Pornographic parody films
Parodies of Spider-Man
Films directed by Axel Braun
2010s superhero films
2010s English-language films
Unofficial Spider-Man films